Ernest Elliott Austen (25 July 1891 – 21 May 1985) was an Australian racewalker. He competed in the men's 10 kilometres walk at the 1924 Summer Olympics.

References

External links
 

1891 births
1985 deaths
Athletes (track and field) at the 1924 Summer Olympics
Australian male racewalkers
Olympic athletes of Australia
Place of birth missing